Md. Abul Kalam Azad is a Bangladesh Awami League politician and the incumbent Member of Parliament from Gaibandha-4.

Early life
Azad was born on 23 August 1958. He completed his master's degree in geography from Rajshahi University .

Career
Azad was elected to Parliament on 5 January 2014 from Gaibandha-4 as an independent candidate. In 2016 he was accused of being involved with attacks on indigenous Santal community.

References

Awami League politicians
Living people
1958 births
10th Jatiya Sangsad members